Banka Kombëtare Tregtare (BKT) is the largest and oldest operating commercial bank in Albania.

History

Early establishments
The first branch of Banka Kombëtare Tregtare was established in Durrës on 29 November 1925, in the historical building where today's BKT Durrës Branch is situated. This building actually represents the oldest Albanian financial institution in the country. 1 November 1926 and 15 November 1926 are the dates in which BKT's Shkodra and Vlora Branches were established respectively.

Banka Kombëtare Tregtare (BKT), with today's name, was established in January 1993, after the merging of the Banka Tregtare Shqiptare (BTSH) and Banka Kombëtare e Shqipërisë (BKSH). Actually BKT is the largest and the oldest commercial bank in Albania.

BTSH was established in 1991 due to the sub-division of the activities of the State Bank of Albania, the main activity of which was managing the foreign trade operations of the state-owned entities with former socialist countries.

The BKSH on the other hand was established in 1992 as a result of a second sub-division of the State Bank of Albania. BKSH was set up to manage the domestic trading activity of the State-owned entities. The assets and liabilities from the activities of these two entities were transferred to BKT accounts since it was first established.

Banka Kombëtare Tregtare was established as a Joint Stock Company in July 1997, with assets reaching ALL 2.7 billion.

Privatization
The bank accomplished its privatization process in the year 2000. Particularly on 6 July 2000, The Albanian Parliament approved the sale contract between the Ministry of Finance and the Consortium of International Investors consisting of Kentbank with 60% of the shares, International Finance Corporation (IFC) with 20%, and European Bank for Reconstruction and Development with 20%. The transfer of ownership entered into force on 17 October 2000. By November of the same year, the new shareholders invested US$10 million, recapitalizing the bank.

In 2001, the establishment has had major transformations brought by the new highly experienced shareholders and managers, These transformations included the development of a new infrastructure, and the restructuring of all aspects of the bank's operations from personnel and procedures to IT infrastructure. At that moment, the young and dynamic team of professionals that the bank employed was committed to achieving perfection. Two years after, the paid-up capital reached the amount of US$14, 64 million, according to the general meeting in February 2003, turning the bank into the most capitalized bank in the whole Albanian banking system.

2006 started with a new vision for Banka Kombëtare Tregtare. With the authorization of the Bank of Albania and pursuant to the specific court decision issued on 9 June 2006, the transfer of 60% plus 2 of the bank's shares possessed by Kent Bank was approved in favour of Çalik-Seker Konsorsiyum Yatirim A.S. Eventually after the decision to expand in Kosovo in September 2007, the institution already had 24 branches opened, ranking the largest Albanian bank in the region.

On 30 June 2009, Çalik Financial Services bought the shares of the International Finance Corporation and the European Bank for Reconstruction and Development, making the former the only bank's shareholder owning 100% of the shares.

References

External links
 Official Website

Banks of Albania
Banks established in 1993
Albanian brands
1993 establishments in Albania